Diane Elizabeth McCauley (born 4 June 1946) is a former Australian politician.

Born at Wondai, she received a Bachelor of Arts from the University of Queensland and worked as a grazier. She was a Banana Shire Councillor from 1985 to 1990 and part-owned a cattle property from 1975. In 1986 she was elected to the Queensland Legislative Assembly as the National Party member for Callide. In 1990 she became the National Party's Spokesperson on Health, to which Women's Affairs and Local Government were added in 1991. She became Shadow Minister for Local Government in 1992 and Minister for Local Government and Planning in 1996. McCauley retired in 1998.

References

1946 births
Living people
National Party of Australia members of the Parliament of Queensland
Members of the Queensland Legislative Assembly
Queensland local councillors
University of Queensland alumni
Women members of the Queensland Legislative Assembly
Women local councillors in Australia